The Church of the Nativity of the Theotokos in Mikluševci in eastern Croatia is a Greek Catholic parish church of the Greek Catholic Church of Croatia and Serbia. It was constructed in 1907. The local Pannonian Rusyns Greek Catholic community was established in 1859 and canonically recognized in 1930. The church was damaged during the Croatian War of Independence. The Greek Catholic Rusyn community started to settle in Mikluševci in the early 19th century and already in 1880 out of 712 inhabitants 467 were Greek Catholic, 227 Eastern Orthodox, 11 Roman Catholic and 7 Jewish

See also
Ruthenian Uniate Church
Hungarian Greek Catholic Church
Križevci Cathedral
Greek Catholic Co-cathedral of Saints Cyril and Methodius, Zagreb
St. Nicholas Cathedral, Ruski Krstur
Church of St. Nicholas, Mikluševci
Pannonian Rusyn
1993 Roman Catholic and Eastern Orthodox declaration on uniate Eastern Catholic Churches
Ecumenism

References

Pannonian Rusyns
Greek Catholic Church of Croatia and Serbia
Greek Catholic church buildings in Croatia
Religious buildings and structures in Vukovar-Syrmia County